Shivashan (also Romanized as Shīvāshān; also known as Shīvāshā) is a village in Bask-e Kuleseh Rural District, in the Central District of Sardasht County, West Azerbaijan Province, Iran. At the 2006 census, its population was 118, in 25 families.

References 

Populated places in Sardasht County